Roman Feliński (4 February 1886 – 22 March 1953) was a Polish architect. He authored the first Polish book on urban planning. He worked on development plans for Gdynia and Warsaw, and designed over 150 buildings, among others, the Magnus Department Store and a dozen or so tenement houses in Lemberg.

References

Further reading
 J. Lewicki. Roman Feliński architekt i urbanista, Pionier nowoczesnej architektury. Neriton. 2007.

1886 births
1953 deaths
Architects from Lviv
People from the Kingdom of Galicia and Lodomeria
Polish Austro-Hungarians
Technical University of Munich alumni